Blackbeard was a notorious English pirate.

Blackbeard may also refer to:
Blackbeard: Terror at Sea, a BBC miniseries
Blackbeard (miniseries), a Hallmark Channel miniseries of 2006
Blackbeard the Pirate, a 1952 film by Raoul Walsh
Blackbeard (musical), a musical by Rob Gardner
Blackbeard (One Piece), a character in One Piece
Blackbeard (Pirates of the Caribbean), a character in Pirates of the Caribbean
Blackbeard (Our Flag Means Death), a character in Our Flag Means Death

See also
Blackbeard's Castle, a National Historic Landmark in the U.S. Virgin Islands
Blackbeard's Ghost, a 1968 film
Blackbeard's Lost Treasure Train, a roller coaster at Six Flags Great Adventure
Dennis Bovell or Blackbear, British-based reggae artist
Bluebeard (disambiguation)
Redbeard (disambiguation)